Qeshlaq-e Qiyujik (also Romanized as Qeshlāq-e Qīyūjīk; also known as Qeshlāq-e Qūyūjāq, Qīyūjīk, and Shūr Qū’ī) is a village in Nur Ali Beyk Rural District, in the Central District of Saveh County, Markazi Province, Iran. At the 2006 census, its population was 118, in 21 families.

References 

Populated places in Saveh County